Pombos is a city in 
Pernambuco, Brazil. According to IBGE, it had an estimated population of 27,148 inhabitants in 2020.

Geography
 State – Pernambuco
 Region – Zona da mata Pernambucana
 Boundaries – Passira   (N);  Primavera   (S);  Gravatá and Chã Grande  (W); Vitória de Santo Antão   (E)
 Area – 207.66 km2
 Elevation – 208 m
 Hydrography – Ipojuca and Capibaribe River rivers
 Vegetation – Subperenifólia forest
 Climate – Hot tropical and humid
 Annual average temperature – 23.8 c
 Distance to Recife – 60 km

Economy
The main economic activities in Pombos are based in commerce and agribusiness, especially sugarcane, pineapples, manioc, lemons and livestock such as cattle and goats.

Economic indicators

Economy by Sector
2006

Health indicators

References

Municipalities in Pernambuco